The Klebit Bok or Kelavit Bok is the traditional shield of the Kayan and the Kenyah people originating from Borneo. It is similar to the shields used by other Dayak people such as the Kliau of the Iban.

Description
The Klebit Bok is a shield in a shape of a hexagon and painted on both sides. On its front, three demonic faces are often painted, in red, white and black and arranged vertically. Their staring, round eyes and grotesquely fanged mouths are surrounded by tufts of human hair attached with resin.

The front is richly decorated with clumps of human hair forcefully pressed into the narrow cracks of wood before being secured by means of fresh wax. The hair is allegedly from hunted heads. It completes the designs, making the shield all the more terrifying for one's enemies.

The reverse of the shield frequently depicts one or two figures whose heads and limbs dissolve into fantastic tendrils. Its name is derived from klebit (meaning "shield") and bok (meaning "hair") indicating a strong connection between the shield and the hair with which it is decorated.

See also

Kurabit
Baluse

References 

Shields
Weapons of Indonesia